The 1996 Thomas & Uber Cup was the 19th tournament of the Thomas Cup, and the 16th tournament of the Uber Cup, which are the major international team competitions in world badminton.

About 1996 Thomas & Uber Cup

Press Conference 
The 1996 Thomas Cup press conference was held in Bank Rakyat Indonesia's building in Sentra BRI complex in Sudirman, Central Jakarta. The press conference is led by Putera Sampoerna, the chairman of PT HM Sampoerna Tbk, manufacturer of A Mild, the 5th Indonesian largest cigarette brand. A Mild also as the main sponsor of the 1996 TUC.

Opening and closing ceremony 
The opening and closing ceremony of the 1996 TUC also led by Putera Sampoerna, because A Mild was the main sponsor of the 1996 TUC.

Indonesia's double title champion 
Indonesia's Thomas & Uber Cup Squads unite the title champion in Thomas Cup (tenth title) and Uber Cup (third title).

Squads 
There were eight teams competed for Thomas and Uber Cups respectively.

Thomas Cup

Teams
56 teams took part in the competition, and eight teams qualified for the final Stage, including Indonesia, as defending champion, and Hong Kong, as host team.

Final stage

Group A

Group B

Knockout stage

Semi-finals

Final

Uber Cup

Teams
47 teams took part in the competition, and eight teams qualified for the final Stage.

Final stage

Group A

Group B

Knockout stage

Semi-finals

Final

References

Smash: 1996 Thomas Cup - Final Round
Smash: 1996 Uber Cup - Final Round

External links
 Mike's Badminton Populorum - Uber Cup
 Mike's Badminton Populorum - Thomas Cup 
 Semi-final results

Thomas & Uber Cup
Thomas Uber Cup
Thomas Uber Cup
Badminton tournaments in Hong Kong
Badminton in Hong Kong